Amarjyoti Choudhury (born 1950) is an Indian educationist, scientist, actor, reciter, playwright, poet, novelist, orator and editor. He is a former Vice-Chancellor of Gauhati University and a former Pro-vice-chancellor of Tezpur University. After superannuation from Tezpur University, he occupied the CV Raman Chair of Applied Physics and later that of Vice-chancellor of University of Science and Technology, Meghalaya. He was also the Vice-Chancellor of Assam down town University from 1 December 2017 to 31 August 2020. Now, he is the editor of renowned Assamese daily Dainik Asam.

Early life
Born in Dibrugarh, Assam to Lakshyadhar Choudhury, the renowned litterateur, playwright and actor with socialist leaning and Usha Choudhury, a committed Gandhian, Amarjyoti is the eldest of five siblings. He topped the High School Leaving examination of  the entire state of Assam. A graduate with Honours in Physics from Gauhati University, he did his masters in Physics from Delhi University. Next he obtained his doctorate degree from University of Oxford.

Career

Teaching career
Choudhury has taught at Jorhat Engineering College, Cotton College, BITS Pilani, Gauhati University and Tezpur University. He has acted as visiting professor to European Laboratory for Non linear Spectroscopy  and Nuclear Science Centre, New Delhi. He has collaborated with P.N Lebedev Institute Moscow, University of Southampton and polytechnic University of Bucharest.

Research Contribution
A researcher in Optics, Quantum Electronics, Condensed Matter Physics NanoPhotonics and Nanotechnology, he is credited with 148 research papers in peer reviewed National and International Journals. So far, twenty scholars have received doctorate degree with his expert guidance.

A theoretical paper jointly authored by Choudhury along with his supervisor CJR Sheppard dwelt extensively on confocal geometry of scanning laser microscopy. It is probably the first publication using the technical term 'confocal microscopy'.

As a scientific communicator
Choudhury has regularly contributed as a scientific communicator. He is a noted author on scientific themes in a number of Assamese dailies and magazines. He was commissioned by National Book Trust for translating three books on scientific themes from English to Assamese. These are Ramanujan, Satyendra Nath Basu and The Shrinking Universe. He has also authored a book on Nanotechnology which is published by the Assam Science Society.

Contribution in cultural field
Choudhury was a child actor in two Assamese films, namely Mak aru Morom and Amar Ghar. He also created his own space in Assamese Theatre as actor, director and playwright. Choudhury's rendition of the self composed poem on the death of Bhupen Hazarika is regarded as a milestone in the world of recitation.

Literary contribution
His trilogy of plays, titled Bhoyor Tongighorot Tora has been well received. His collection of poems, titled Etiya Tezot and Aan Ekura Meji has received good reviews. " Rupantorot Moi" his autobiographical piece on his childhood has been recognised as a hit. He has also authored two notable novels in Assamese language. The first one, titled Gosor nisina sankokhon had a strong presence of feminist and environmental perspective. The next one titled Rodkasholir manuh is marked by a  postmodern absurdist sensibility.

Orator and a Quizmaster
He was notable in  the quizzing scenario of the eighties and nineties in Assam along with Professor Dilip Baruah.

Personal life 
In 1978 Choudhury married Kaberi, the youngest daughter of cultural-personality Tilak Das and singer of her times, Chandra Prabha Das. They have a daughter, Amrita and a son, Arunav.

References 

Educators from Assam
1950 births
Living people
Scientists from Assam
Gauhati University alumni
Delhi University alumni
Alumni of the University of Oxford
Academic staff of Gauhati University
Academic staff of Tezpur University